Mern is a village with a population of 1,005 (1 January 2022) located in Vordingborg Municipality, Region Zealand in Denmark.

The village is a former Railway town at the Næstved-Præstø-Mern Railroad which was closed in 1961.

Notable people 
 Line Luplau (1823 in Mern - 1891) a Danish feminist and suffragist.
 Anders Lassen, VC, MC & Two Bars (1920 in Høvdingsgaard estate, Mern Parish – 1945) a highly decorated Danish soldier, who was the only non-Commonwealth recipient of the British Victoria Cross in the WWII

References 

Cities and towns in Region Zealand
Vordingborg Municipality